Tropidoptera is a genus of small, air-breathing land snails, terrestrial pulmonate gastropod mollusks in the family Amastridae. It is endemic to the Hawaiian Islands.

Species
Species within the genus Tropidotera include:
 Tropidoptera alata
 Tropidoptera discus
 Tropidoptera heliciformis
 Tropidoptera rex
 Tropidoptera wesleyi

References

 Nomenclator Zoologicus info

 
Amastridae
Taxa named by César Marie Félix Ancey
Taxonomy articles created by Polbot